Gnomophalium is a genus of flowering plants in the family Asteraceae.

Species
There is only one known species, Gnomophalium pulvinatum, native to Egypt, Sudan, Iran, the Indian Subcontinent, Afghanistan, and Tibet.

References

Gnaphalieae
Monotypic Asteraceae genera
Flora of Asia
Flora of Egypt
Flora of Sudan